Annabelle Thompson, later McFarlane (November 22, 1924 – August 10, 1983), was a pitcher who played in the All-American Girls Professional Baseball League during the  season. She batted and threw right handed.

Born in Edmonton, Alberta, Annie Thompson was one of the 68 players born in Canada to join the All-American Girls Professional Baseball League in its twelve years history. She also became one of the sixty original players recruited by the league for its inaugural season.

Thompson was assigned to the Racine Belles, a team managed by former big leaguer Johnny Gottselig, as part of a pitching staff headed by Mary Nesbitt, Joanne Winter and Gloria Marks.

In her only season she posted a team second-best 11 wins and ranked among the top 10 pitchers of the league, ending eighth in innings pitched (223) and ninth in earned run average (3.51), while tying for seventh for the most wins to help Racine win the championship.

Thompson is part of Women in Baseball, a permanent display based at the Baseball Hall of Fame and Museum in Cooperstown, New York, which was unveiled in 1988 to honor the entire All-American Girls Professional Baseball League. She also gained honorary induction into the Canadian Baseball Hall of Fame in 1998. She died in Edmonton in 1983.

Career statistics
Pitching

Batting

Fielding

Sources

All-American Girls Professional Baseball League players
Baseball people from Alberta
Canadian baseball players
Sportspeople from Edmonton
1924 births
1983 deaths
20th-century American women
20th-century American people